Alan T. Sugiyama High School at South Lake (ATS) offers a small, personalized learning environment dedicated to ensuring that future leaders realize their full potential. ATS values youth culture and voice, and offers a family atmosphere that connects students with real world opportunities.

From music and entertainment industries to Performance Arts, Radio and Filmmaking, ATS has compiled a wide variety of dedicated mentors, experts and working artists. The goal is to teach ATS students industry-based skills that lead to real-world work opportunities or pathways to college programs after graduation.

History
Opened as Sharples Alternative Secondary School in 1981, after the closing of Sharples Junior High School, the school operated in the Casper W. Sharples Junior High School Building until 1988, when Franklin students used the building while their school was renovated. The Alternative Secondary School moved to Washington Institute for Applied Technology (the former Seattle Opportunities Industrialization Center Building) at 22nd Avenue and Jackson Street. The program returned to the Casper W. Sharples Junior High School Building in the Fall of 1990. 

In the Fall of 1999, the South Shore Middle School moved into the Casper W. Sharples Junior High School Building, due to issues with the open floor plan of the South Shore Middle School Building. With this change, the Sharples Alternative Secondary School moved into the South Shore Middle School Building, and was renamed South Lake High School, and it shared the building with a number of programs. 

In the Fall of 2008, South Lake High School moved to a new building, where they currently operate.

Facilities
In 2005, the Seattle School Board voted 6-1 to approve construction of a new facility for South Lake High School, with construction planning to begin in July 2007. In the Fall of 2008, South Lake High School opened their new building, where they currently operate.

Awards and recognitions
In 2014, the principal of South Lake High School, Barbara Moore, won the Thomas B. Foster Award for Excellence, an award recognizing outstanding secondary school principals in Seattle. This award was also accompanied with a $50,000 cash grant for the high school.

References

External links

High schools in King County, Washington
Seattle Public Schools
Public high schools in Washington (state)
Alternative schools in the United States